Marius Nacht (born 1962) is one of Israel's leading serial entrepreneurs, founders and investors. In 1993 Marius Nacht co-founded Check Point Software (NASDAQ 100 CHKP), along with Gil Shwed & Shlomo Kramer, and is regarded as one of the founding fathers of Israel’s cybersecurity industry. They launched their tiny startup with a mere loan of $300K, and built Check Point into a Nasdaq 100 company with a market cap of about $18 billion. Nacht served in various managerial roles including R&D, Product, Sales, Marketing, and Support.  In 2020, he stepped down as Chairman of Check Point, to focus on healthtech initiatives and other ventures he has founded and funded.

Marius Nacht is Co-Founder & Anchor Investor of aMoon Funds, a growing healthtech platform managing over $1.1B, investing in Growth & Early-Stage companies that are accelerating cure through the convergence of healthcare and technology.  Although seldom interviewed in the media, on several occasions Nacht has publicly shared his vision for Israel to become a global hub for technologies that will impact and save millions of lives across the world.

Nacht is a serial entrepreneur and investor in tens of companies, in the fields of life-sciences, healthcare, software, AI, mobility, cybersecurity, environmental, energy, and semiconductors.

History 
Marius Nacht was born in post-war Communist Romania to Holocaust survivor parents. When he was three years old, his family escaped the regime of Ceausescu, and immigrated to the city of Ashkelon in Israel.

Nacht is a graduate of Talpiot’s 1980 cohort, the IDF’s most elite R&D program. Every year, Talpiot recruits several dozen talented students who undergo a rigorous three-year academic and military training program, including research, development and ethics. Talpiot graduates commit an additional six years, to serving in a variety of roles at the forefront of technology for the IDF & Ministry of Defense.

Nacht earned a BSc (cum laude) in Physics and Mathematics from the Hebrew University of Jerusalem in 1983, and an MSc in Electrical Engineering and Communication Systems from Tel Aviv University in 1987.

In 2021, The Marker listed his net worth at US$3.5 billion.

Personal life
Nacht lives in Tel Aviv with his 4 children.

Social activism 
Nacht Philanthropic Ventures is the family’s philanthropic platform. During Covid-19, the foundation launched innovative initiatives focused on humanitarian aid, food security, welfare and culture. Following the fall of the Afghan government to the Taliban in August 2021, Nacht Philanthropic Ventures played a crucial role in funding the transportation, accommodation, food, and security for 278 at-risk human rights workers, activists, and other at-risk individuals.

References 

1962 births
Living people
Israeli business executives
Romanian emigrants to Israel
Romanian Jews